David Manby is a well known canoeist or kayaker from the UK and was a national champion in slalom canoeing C-1. He is considered a pioneer in the sport of canoeing and is probably best known for being involved on the British expedition of the first descent of the Dudh Kosi river.

Early life 
Dave was born to Michael and Eve (née Levick) Manby in Johannesburg, South Africa where his father was the headmaster of the junior school at St John's College. When he was 8 he moved with his family to Shrewsbury, England, where his father became the headmaster of Prestfelde School which he attended. Later he attended Ellesmere College and it was here that he first learnt to canoe. He also attended the University of Nottingham

Dudh Kosi 

In 1976, at the age of 21, Dave was asked to join five other kayakers in a team of ten on the famous first descent of the Dudh Kosi, the river running off Mount Everest the trip leader was Mike Jones. The team left in July and began the 7,500 mile drive in a Transit mini-bus to Kathmandu. Once there a further 180 mile hike, with all the equipment including 10 kayaks, had to be undertaken to reach Everest Base Camp. This was the starting point of the pioneering paddle which involved some of the hardest white water canoed to date. Dave himself had one close call when his boat capsized and in the freezing water was unable to Eskimo roll. Luckily the team managed to get him out of the river before it was too late. The whole expedition was filmed by Leo Dickinson and was shown on British prime time television in boxing day 1976. The film itself won over 50 international awards, and has recently been remastered in Los Angeles and made into a DVD. It was shown again in the UK on BBC 4 on 8 January 2014.

The river is extreme white water. Normally it can't be used for water sports. The first kayak trip was made 1976 by a British expedition under the leadership of Mike Jones.

After Everest 
Dave was involved in more first descent expeditions including the attempted 1978 K2 trip on the Braldu River (Pakistan) in which Mike Jones died while trying to save a companion. Other expeditions include early descent of the Coruh River in Eastern Turkey and the Sezar, Dez and Bakhtiaria Rivers in the Zagros Mountains in Iran. He has also written a book "Many Rivers to Run"

External links
 Dave's home page
 Dudh Kosi film 
 Dudh Kosi film recap
 Many Rivers to Run
 Canoe & Kayak Magazine
 Dudh Kosi Expedition DVD

1954 births
Living people
Kayakers
British male canoeists
Sportspeople from Johannesburg
Sportspeople from Shrewsbury
Alumni of the University of Nottingham
South African emigrants to the United Kingdom